Carl Heinrich Goßler (17 April 1885 in Hamburg – 9 September 1914 in Maurupt-le-Montois) was a German rower who competed in the 1900 Summer Olympics. He was the coxswain of the German boat Germania Ruder Club, Hamburg, which won the gold medal in the coxed fours final B.

He was killed in action during World War I.

See also
 List of Olympians killed in World War I

References

External links

 

1885 births
1914 deaths
Coxswains (rowing)
Olympic rowers of Germany
Rowers at the 1900 Summer Olympics
Olympic gold medalists for Germany
Olympic medalists in rowing
German male rowers
German military personnel killed in World War I
Medalists at the 1900 Summer Olympics
Rowers from Hamburg